Eupithecia lindti is a moth in the family Geometridae. It is found in Afghanistan, the mountains of Uzbekistan, Tajikistan, and northern Pakistan and India.

References

Moths described in 1988
lindti
Moths of Asia